Nazo Ekezie  (born December 22) is a Nigerian actress and film producer. She won the 2017 City People Movie Awards (eight in the series) for Best Upcoming Actress of the Year (English).

Biography
Ekezie is the second out of four children.

Education

Ekezie attended her secondary school at the Federal Government Girls College, Lejja, Nsukka in Enugu State. She has a bachelor’s degree in English and Linguistics from the Ebonyi State University.

Career

Ekezie is a Nigerian actress and film producer who started acting between 2009 and 2010. She came into the limelight after featuring in the movie Thanks for Coming, produced by Uche Nancy.

In 2018, Ekezie produced her own movie, Flawed, She featured in the movie alongside Nollywood actors such as Ebele Okaro, Mofe Duncan, and Bolaji Ogunmola.

Ekezie owns the Unoaku Production Company.

On November 26, 2020, the birthday of the Nigerian singer and music producer Don Jazzy, Ekezie asked Don Jazzy out on a date while sending birthday wishes via Instagram. He accepted the request.

Selected filmography

Accolades

Ekezie won the City People Movie Awards (eight in the series) for Best Upcoming Actress of the Year (English). The award ceremony was held on October 8, 2017, at Balmoral Event Center, Oregun, Ikeja, Lagos, and her award was presented by City People Magazine.

References

External links 
 Ekezie on IMDb

Nigerian film actresses
Living people
Igbo actresses
21st-century Nigerian actresses
Actresses from Anambra State
Year of birth missing (living people)
Nigerian film producers